Pix or PIX may refer to:

Abbreviations
Pictures
"Pix", abbreviation used by Variety magazine for the phrase motion pictures

Television
Short for KPIX-TV, television channel 5, San Francisco
Sony Pix, an English movie channel in India
Short for WPIX, television channel 11, New York City

Technology
Pix (electronic payment system), a Brazilian electronic payment system
Cisco PIX, an IP firewall and network address translation (NAT) appliance
Kid Pix, a bitmap drawing program aimed at children
Microsoft Pix, a camera phone app for iOS from Microsoft
PIX (Microsoft), a performance analysis tool for DirectX from Microsoft

Media
Moon Pix, the fourth album by American singer-songwriter Cat Power
Pix (magazine), an Australian magazine published from 1938 to 1972
Sunday Pix, a Christian comic book published weekly

People
Mary Pix (1666–1709), English novelist and playwright
Noel Pix (born 1977), a German rock and house musician

Other uses
Glass Eye Pix, an independent film studio based in New York City
Pix Brook, a stream that flows through Letchworth Garden City in Hertfordshire, England
Pix Capri Theatre, a theater on the historic US Highway 51 in Jackson, Mississippi

See also
PICS (disambiguation)
Pyx (disambiguation)